Eleutherodactylus rubrimaculatus is a species of frog in the family Eleutherodactylidae. It is found in southeastern Pacific Chiapas, Mexico, and in the adjacent southwestern Guatemala. The specific name rubrimaculatus is Latin and means "spotted with red", and refers to the coloration of this species. Common names dusky chirping frog and red-spotted chirping frog have been coined for it.

Description
Adult males measure  and adult females (in a small sample)  in snout–vent length. The tympanum is distinct and relatively large. The digital tips are scarcely expanded. The inner metatarsal tubercle is elongate and twice the size of the small, conical
outer metatarsal tubercle. The dorsum is brown with small red spots. The venter is gray. Males have vocal slits.

Habitat and conservation
It is an abundant species within its restricted range, but habitat loss and alteration caused by agriculture and logging are major threats to it. It is found in Encrucijada and El Triunfo Biosphere Reserves in Mexico.

References

rubrimaculatus
Amphibians of Guatemala
Amphibians of Mexico
Amphibians described in 1945
Taxa named by Edward Harrison Taylor
Taxa named by Hobart Muir Smith
Taxonomy articles created by Polbot